The Finnish Steam Locomotive Class B1 is an  built by Beyer, Peacock & Company, at its Gorton Foundry in Manchester, England. Nine were constructed between 1868 and 1890. They were designed for use as shunting locomotives.

Number 9 is Finland's oldest preserved locomotive and is preserved at the Finnish Railway Museum. The B1 was nicknamed “Ram”. They were numbered 9–10, 53–56, 150–151. B1 locomotives were withdrawn in the 1920s. The last was withdrawn in 1928.

References

 Sakari K. Salo: Höyryveturikirja, s. 14. Helsinki: Kustantaja Laaksonen, 2009. .

External links

Finnish Railway Museum
Steam Locomotives in Finland Including the Finnish Railway Museum

Beyer, Peacock locomotives
B1
VR locomotives
0-4-2ST locomotives
5 ft gauge locomotives